Assam separatist movements refers to a series of multiple insurgent and separatist movements that are or have been operating the in Northeast Indian state of Assam.
The conflict started in the 1970s following tension between the native indigenous Assamese people and the Indian government over alleged neglect, political, social, cultural, economic issues and increased levels of illegal immigration from Bangladesh. The conflict has resulted in the deaths of 12,000 United Liberation Front of Assam (ULFA) militants and 18,000 others.

Several organisations contribute to the insurgency including the ULFA, the Adivasi National Liberation Army, Karbi Longri N.C. Hills Liberation Front (KLNLF) and the National Democratic Front of Bodoland (NDFB) with ULFA perhaps the largest of these groups, and one of the oldest, having been founded in 1979. The ULFA has attacked Hindi-speaking migrant workers and a movement exists favouring secession from the Republic of India. The alleged neglect and economic, social, cultural and political exploitation by the Indian state are the main reasons behind the growth of this secessionist movement.

The ULFA seeks to establish a sovereign Assam via armed struggle. MULTA (Muslim United Liberation Tigers of Assam), on the other hand, seeks to establish an Islamic state in India via the jihadist struggle of Muslims of both indigenous and migrant origin. The Government of India banned the ULFA in 1990 and classifies it as a terrorist group, while the US State Department lists it under "other groups of concern".

Founded at Rang Ghar, a historic structure dating to the Ahom kingdom on April7, 1979, the ULFA has been the subject of military operations by the Indian Army since 1990, which have continued into the present. In the past two decades some 30,000 people have died in the clash between the rebels and the government.
Though separatist sentiment is considered strong, it is disputed if the secessionist movement continues to enjoy popular support. Conversely, assertions of Assamese nationalism are found in Assamese literature and culture. The neglect and exploitation by the Indian state are common refrains in the Assamese-language media with some reports casting the ULFA leaders as saviors.

Internationally acclaimed Assamese novelist Indira Goswami has tried to broker peace for several years between the rebels and the government. In a recent development Hiren Gohain, a public intellectual, has stepped in to expedite the process.

In 2012, all Adivasi militants including those of Adivasi Cobra Force surrendered.

On 15 May 2019, twelve people were injured after a grenade exploded in front of a shopping mall in Guwahati. Days later the United Liberation Front of Assam claimed responsibility for the attack, and the authorities arrested the main suspects.

In 2020 and 2021, all Bodo, Karbi, Kuki and Dimasa militants surrendered to the government of India.

In 2022, Gorkha and Tiwa Militants also surrendered.

See also
Operation All Clear
2008 Assam bombings
Bhimajuli Massacre
2009 Guwahati bombings
2009 Assam serial blasts
Insurgency in North-East India
Separatist movements of India

References

1990s in Assam
2000s in Assam
2010s in Assam
2020s in Assam

Separatism in India
Assamese nationalism
Politics of Assam
Insurgencies in Asia
Ethnic conflicts
Rebellions in India